The Chatton transmitting station is a broadcasting and telecommunications facility, between Wooler and Seahouses, Northumberland. It is owned and operated by Arqiva, and situated within the boundary of Bewick and Beanley Moors SSSI.

Services listed by frequency

Digital radio (DAB)

Digital television

Before switchover

Analogue television
Analogue television is no longer available from Chatton; BBC2 analogue was closed on 12 September 2012, followed by the remaining three channels on 26 September 2012.

Channel 5 was not available from Chatton on analogue but could be received from Burnhope instead on channel 68 in the south of Chatton's transmission area.

See also 
 List of masts
 List of radio stations in the United Kingdom

References

External links 
 http://tx.mb21.co.uk/gallery/chatton/index.php
 Chatton Transmitter at thebigtower.com

Transmitter sites in England